W. R. Bergen was the first head basketball coach at the University of Tulsa.  He coached the Tulsa Golden Hurricane men's basketball team for two seasons, from 1907 to 1909.

Bergen established the Tulsa basketball squad soon after Tulsa moved from Muskogee to Tulsa.  The team played its first game against Oklahoma A&M, and the two teams split their match-ups that season.  After Bergen left, Tulsa did not field a basketball team for the next several seasons.

References

Year of birth missing
Year of death missing
Tulsa Golden Hurricane men's basketball coaches